Giorgio Pasquali (29 April 1885, Rome9 July 1952, Belluno) was an Italian classical scholar who made a fundamental contribution to the field of textual criticism.

He studied classical philology at La Sapienza University of Rome, graduating in 1907 with a dissertation entitled La commedia mitologica e i suoi precedenti nella letteratura greca (Mythological comedy and its precedents in Greek literature). In 1908 and 1909 he continued his studies in Basel and Göttingen. He went on to teach in Rome, Messina, Göttingen and Florence, where he became full professor of Greek literature in 1924, before occupying the chair of Greek and that of Latin literature. In 1925 he signed the Manifesto of the Anti-Fascist Intellectuals. From 1931 onwards he also taught at the Scuola Normale Superiore in Pisa. He received various honours, including an honorary degree from the University of Göttingen (1937) and being elected to the Royal Academy of Italy (1942).

Contribution to textual criticism 
Pasquali's greatest claim to fame is the book Storia della tradizione e critica del testo (History of the tradition and textual criticism). It was born as a reaction to Textkritik by Paul Maas, of which Pasquali first wrote a long review that appeared in several instalments in the journal Gnomon. His book, which came out in 1934, complements the work of Maas rather than refuting it. A thoroughly revised second edition appeared in 1952, the year of Pasquali's death. The book has not been translated into English.

The book makes several major contributions to textual criticism, and especially to its sub-field of stemmatics. Pasquali concentrates on ancient Greek and Latin texts, which we know mostly through manuscript copies written in the Middle Ages or the Renaissance. Before him, scholars had concentrated on abstract relationships between the manuscripts and drew up geometric stemmata codicum or "manuscript family trees"; Pasquali shows the benefit of seeing the transmission of a text as a historical process. He also studies special cases of textual transmissions, for example where the manuscripts contain different versions of the same passages, both (or all) of them written by the author; and where anomalous sources such as collations (textual notes) by humanists conserve readings from lost manuscripts. He shows that a fairly recent manuscript may conserve valuable textual variants, if it goes back to a valuable lost source, an idea that is expressed in the maxim recentiores non deteriores.

Bibliography 
A. La Penna, Pasquali, Giorgio, in Dizionario Biografico degli Italiani vol. 81, 2014 .
G. Pasquali, Orazio lirico, Florence, Le Monnier, 1920.
G. Pasquali, Lingua nuova e antica, Florence, Le Monnier, 1985.
G. Pasquali, Scritti filologici: letteratura greca, letteratura latina, cultura contemporanea, recensioni, Florence, Olschki, 1986.
G. Pasquali, Storia della tradizione e critica del testo, Florence, Le Monnier, 1952 (1st ed. 1934).
G. Pasquali, Pagine stravaganti di un filologo, Florence, Le Lettere, 1994 (1st ed. 1933).
G. Pasquali, Pagine stravaganti vecchie e nuove, pagine meno stravaganti, Florence, Le Lettere, 1994 (1st ed. 1935).
G. Pasquali, Filologia e storia, Florence, Le Monnier, 1998.
Giorgio Pasquali e la filologia classica del Novecento: atti del Convegno (Firenze-Pisa, 2-3 dicembre 1985), Florence, Olschki, 1988.

References

1885 births
1952 deaths
Italian classical philologists
Italian classical scholars
Manifesto of the Anti-Fascist Intellectuals
Writers from Rome
Sapienza University of Rome alumni
Academic staff of the Scuola Normale Superiore di Pisa